Ha Hong-seon (born 1 June 1991) is a South Korean speed skater. He competed in two events at the 2010 Winter Olympics.

References

1991 births
Living people
South Korean male speed skaters
Olympic speed skaters of South Korea
Speed skaters at the 2010 Winter Olympics
Speed skaters from Seoul